The 2010 season was Woodlands Wellington's 15th competitive and consecutive season in the top flight of Singapore football and 23rd year in existence as a football club.

Transfers

In

Pre-season

Out

Pre-season

Squads

First team squad

S-League

Final standings

Overview

Matches

RHB Singapore Cup

First round

Singapore League Cup

First round

Quarter-finals

Semi-finals

Finals

Appearances and goals

|-

*** Denotes Prime League players

Goalscoring statistics

Includes all competitive matches. The list is sorted by shirt number when total goals are equal.

{| class="wikitable" style="font-size: 95%; text-align: center;"
|-
!width=15|
!width=15|
!width=15|
!width=15|
!width=150|Name
!width=80|S-League
!width=80|RHB Singapore Cup
!width=80|League Cup
!width=80|Total
|-
|1
|9
|FW
|
|Laakkad Abdelhadi
|8
|1
|1
|10
|-
|rowspan="2"|2
|4
|DF
|
|Kazuki Yoshino
|3
|0
|0
|3
|-
|11
|MF
|
|Mohd Noor Ali
|2
|0
|1
|3
|-
|3
|19
|FW
|
|Rizawan Abdullah
|1
|0
|1
|2
|-
|rowspan="5"|4
|2
|DF
|
|Winston Yap
|1
|0
|0
|1
|-
|3
|MF
|
|Azlan Alipah
|1
|0
|0
|1
|-
|7
|MF
|
|Syed Karim
|1
|0
|0
|1
|-
|8
|MF
|
|Shahri Musa
|1
|0
|0
|1
|-
|36
|FW
|
|Navin Neil Vanu
|0
|0
|1
|1
|-
|colspan="4"|
|TOTALS
|18
|1
|3
|22

Disciplinary record
Includes all competitive matches. The list is sorted by shirt number when total cards are equal.
{| class="wikitable" style="font-size: 95%; text-align: center;"
|-
| rowspan="2" style="width:2.5%; text-align:center;"|
| rowspan="2" style="width:3%; text-align:center;"|
| rowspan="2" style="width:3%; text-align:center;"|
| rowspan="2" style="width:3%; text-align:center;"|
| rowspan="2" style="width:12%; text-align:center;"|Name
| colspan="3" style="text-align:center;"|S-League
| colspan="3" style="text-align:center;"|RHB Singapore Cup
| colspan="3" style="text-align:center;"|Singapore League Cup
| colspan="3" style="text-align:center;"|Total
|-
! style="width:25px; background:#fe9;"|
! style="width:28px; background:#ff8888;"|
! style="width:25px; background:#ff8888;"|
! style="width:25px; background:#fe9;"|
! style="width:28px; background:#ff8888;"|
! style="width:25px; background:#ff8888;"|
! style="width:25px; background:#fe9;"|
! style="width:28px; background:#ff8888;"|
! style="width:25px; background:#ff8888;"|
! style="width:35px; background:#fe9;"|
! style="width:35px; background:#ff8888;"|
! style="width:35px; background:#ff8888;"|
|-
|1
|9
|FW
|
|Laakkad Abdelhadi
|4
|0
|0
|0
|0
|0
|1
|0
|1
|5
|0
|1
|-
|2
|4
|DF
|
|Kazuki Yoshino
|7
|1
|0
|1
|0
|0
|0
|0
|0
|8
|1
|0
|-
|3
|11
|MF
|
|Mohd Noor Ali
|3
|1
|0
|0
|0
|0
|0
|0
|0
|3
|1
|0
|-
|rowspan="2"|4
|10
|DF
|
|Luis Eduardo Hicks
|9
|0
|0
|1
|0
|0
|2
|0
|0
|12
|0
|0
|-
|14
|DF
|
|Sazali Salleh
|11
|0
|0
|0
|0
|0
|1
|0
|0
|12
|0
|0
|-
|5
|5
|DF
|
|Sahairi Ramri
|6
|0
|0
|1
|0
|0
|1
|0
|0
|8
|0
|0
|-
|6
|6
|DF
|
|Anaz Abdul Hadee
|4
|0
|0
|1
|0
|0
|2
|0
|0
|7
|0
|0
|-
|7
|36
|FW
|
|Navin Neil Vanu
|5
|0
|0
|0
|0
|0
|1
|0
|0
|6
|0
|0
|-
|rowspan="2"|8
|2
|DF
|
|Winston Yap
|4
|0
|0
|0
|0
|0
|1
|0
|0
|5
|0
|0
|-
|3
|MF
|
|Azlan Alipah
|3
|0
|0
|0
|0
|0
|2
|0
|0
|5
|0
|0
|-
|9
|12
|MF
|
|Asraf Rashid
|3
|0
|0
|0
|0
|0
|1
|0
|0
|4
|0
|0
|-
|rowspan="2"|10
|17
|MF
|
|Rachid Lajane
|3
|0
|0
|0
|0
|0
|0
|0
|0
|3
|0
|0
|-
|19
|FW
|
|Rizawan Abdullah
|3
|0
|0
|0
|0
|0
|0
|0
|0
|3
|0
|0
|-
|rowspan="4"|11
|7
|MF
|
|Syed Karim
|1
|0
|0
|0
|0
|0
|0
|0
|0
|1
|0
|0
|-
|13
|MF
|
|Guntur Djafril
|1
|0
|0
|0
|0
|0
|0
|0
|0
|1
|0
|0
|-
|18
|GK
|
|Hafez Mawasi
|0
|0
|0
|1
|0
|0
|0
|0
|0
|1
|0
|0
|-
|31
|MF
|
|Azli Mahmud***
|1
|0
|0
|0
|0
|0
|0
|0
|0
|1
|0
|0
|-
|colspan="4"|
|TOTALS
|68
|2
|0
|5
|0
|0
|12
|0
|1
|85
|2
|1
|-

*** Denotes Prime League players

References

Woodlands Wellington
Woodlands Wellington FC seasons